Biarmia or Bjarmia:
 Bjarmaland, historical country
 1146 Biarmia, asteroid
 , poem